The Consulate General of the United States, Istanbul is one of the diplomatic missions in Turkey. It was targeted in  terrorist attacks in July 2008 and August 2015.

References

See also
 Embassy of Turkey, Washington D.C.
 Ambassadors of Turkey to the United States
 Ambassadors of the United States to Turkey
 Diplomatic missions of the United States

Istanbul
United States
Turkey–United States relations